Rachel Zucker is an American poet born in New York City in 1971. She is the author of five collections of poetry, most recently, SoundMachine (Wave Books 2019). She also co-edited the book Women Poets on Mentorship: Efforts and Affections with fellow poet, Arielle Greenberg.

Biography
Rachel Zucker was born in New York City in 1971. The daughter of storyteller Diane Wolkstein and novelist Benjamin Zucker, she was raised in Greenwich Village and traveled around the world with her parents on Wolkstein's folktale-collecting trips. After high school, Zucker attended Yale University where she majored in Psychology, focusing on Child Development, though she took as many literature, writing and photography classes as she was allowed. Zucker later went on to the Iowa Writers' Workshop where she received her M.F.A. in poetry.

She teaches graduate and undergraduate poetry classes at New York University's Creative Writing Program and in Antioch University's Low-Residency MFA program. She has taught at Yale and served as poet in residence at Fordham University (2005–2007).

Zucker is creator and host of the podcast Commonplace: Conversations with Poets (and Other People).  She is currently working on an immersive audio project called SoundMachine, accompanying her 2019 collection of the same name. Her poem, "In Your Version of Heaven I Am Younger" was featured in the anthology, The Best American Poetry (2001).

Zucker lives in New York City and Scarborough, Maine with her husband and three sons and teaches at New York University and Antioch University. She holds certifications as a labor doula from the Doulas of North America (DONA) and as a collaborative childbirth educator (CCE) from the Childbirth Education Association of Metropolitan New York.  Since that time she has aided many women during labor, birth and postpartum and through her doula work and her writing, advocates for universal access to maternity care.

Awards and honors
 National Endowment for the Arts Creative Writing Fellowship (2013)
 Bagley Wright Lecture Series, Lecturer (2016)
 Salt Hill Poetry Award (1999), judged by C.D. Wright)
 Barrow Street Poetry Prize (2000)
 Center for Book Arts Award (judged by Lynn Emanuel)
 "Museum of Accidents" was a finalist for the National Book Critics Circle Award.

Bibliography

Poetry
 Eating in the Underworld (Wesleyan University Press, 2003)
 The Last Clear Narrative (Wesleyan University Press, 2004)
 The Bad Wife Handbook (Wesleyan University Press, 2006)
 Museum of Accidents (Wave Books, 2009)
 MOTHERs (Counterpath Press, 2013)
 The Pedestrians (Wave Books, 2014)
 SoundMachine (Wave Books, 2019)

Anthologies

Non-fiction
 Home/Birth (1913 Press, 2010)
 MOTHERs (Counterpath Press, 2014)

Critical studies and reviews

References

External links
 
 Poetry Foundation, "Rachel Zucker"
 Nichols, Travis (March 30, 2010). "Rachel Zucker Doesn't Write Your Mother's Mom Poems". The Huffington Post
 "Poem of the Day Podcast: Rachel Zucker’s 'Please Alice Notley Tell Me How to be Old'". InDigest. December 6, 2011
 Chiasson, Dan (June 2, 2014). "Mother Tongue: Poetry and prose by Rachel Zucker". The New Yorker

1971 births
Living people
New York University faculty
Poets from New York (state)
American women poets
Iowa Writers' Workshop alumni
University of Iowa alumni
Writers from New York City
Yale College alumni
21st-century American poets
21st-century American women writers
Antioch University faculty